Parade's End is a five-part BBC/HBO/VRT television serial adapted from the eponymous tetralogy of novels (1924–1928) by Ford Madox Ford. It premiered on BBC Two on 24 August 2012 and on HBO on 26 February 2013.  The series was also screened at the 39th Ghent Film Festival on 11 October 2012. The miniseries was directed by Susanna White and written by Tom Stoppard. The cast was led by Benedict Cumberbatch and Rebecca Hall as Christopher and Sylvia Tietjens, along with Adelaide Clemens, Rupert Everett, Miranda Richardson, Anne-Marie Duff, Roger Allam, Janet McTeer, Freddie Fox, Jack Huston, and Steven Robertson.

The series received widespread critical acclaim and has sometimes been cited as "the highbrow Downton Abbey". In its BBC Two premiere, the series attracted 3.5 million viewers, making it BBC Two's most watched drama since Rome aired in 2005. The miniseries received six BAFTA TV nominations, including Best Actress for Rebecca Hall, and five Primetime Emmy Award nominations, including Best Adapted Screenplay for Tom Stoppard and Best Actor for Benedict Cumberbatch. It won Best Costume Design at the 2013 BAFTAs.

Plot summary
In the years before the First World War, three Britons are drawn into fraught and ultimately tragic relations: Anglican Christopher Tietjens, second son of the lord of the manor of Groby, Yorkshire, who is a disconsolate statistician in London, with traditional Tory beliefs; Catholic Sylvia Satterthwaite, his promiscuous and self-centred socialite wife who has married him knowing that she was already pregnant (possibly by another man); and freethinking Valentine Wannop, a young suffragette, pacifist daughter of a lady novelist, who is torn between her idealism and her attraction to "Chrissy". As the war works a profound change on Europe, and Christopher is badly wounded in France, the conflict shatters and rearranges the lives of all three principals, as well as virtually everyone else in their elite circle.

Production
The series was conceived when Damien Timmer approached playwright Tom Stoppard to write the adaptation. After reading the novels, Stoppard agreed to pen the screenplay, thus marking his return to television after a 30-year absence. Stoppard has stated that he had considered Benedict Cumberbatch for the role of Christopher Tietjens even before Sherlock made him a global star. Adelaide Clemens was cast as Valentine after arriving for her audition in period clothing. Initially, producers were reluctant to cast an Australian actress but were won over on finding that Clemens' father is a British national.

A significant part of the film was shot on location in Kent, at Dorton House and St. Thomas a Becket Church. Additional scenes were filmed at Freemasons' Hall in London and Duncombe Park. The rest of the series was filmed in Belgium, including Poeke Castle in the town of Aalter, utilising television drama tax breaks, with scenes at the Western Front recreated in Flanders.

Stoppard made changes from the source material, such as excluding most of the fourth novel, streamlining the plot to focus on the love triangle, and adding overt sex scenes. The exclusion of the fourth novel is not without precedent; it was also done in Graham Greene's 1963 edition of Parade's End, and Ford himself sometimes referred to it as a trilogy; "He may have written the fourth to fulfill a contract or because he needed more money", said Michael Schmidt, the executor of Ford's literary estate.

Cast

 Benedict Cumberbatch as Christopher Tietjens
 Rebecca Hall as Sylvia Tietjens
 Adelaide Clemens as Valentine Wannop
 Miranda Richardson as Mrs Wannop, Valentine's widowed mother
 Freddie Fox as Edward Wannop, Valentine's younger brother
 Janet McTeer as Mrs Satterthwaite, Sylvia's mother
 Ned Dennehy as Father Consett
 Alan Howard as Tietjens Senior
 Rupert Everett as Mark Tietjens, Christopher's elder half-brother
 Misha Handley as Michael Tietjens (4 years old)
 Rudi Goodman as Michael Tietjens (8 years old)
 Stephen Graham as Vincent MacMaster
 Anne-Marie Duff as Edith Duchemin
 Rufus Sewell as Reverend Duchemin, Edith's husband
 Roger Allam as General Edward Campion
 Patrick Kennedy as Captain McKechnie
 Steven Robertson as Colonel Bill Williams
 Lucinda Raikes as Evie, Sylvia's maid
 Jack Huston as Gerald Drake, Sylvia's former lover
 Tom Mison as Peter "Potty" Perowne, involved in affair with Sylvia
 Jamie Parker as Lord Brownlie, frustrated admirer of Sylvia's
 Anna Skellern as Bobbie Pelham, Sylvia's best friend
 Sasha Waddell as Lady Glorvina, Bobbie Pelham's mother
 Henry Lloyd-Hughes as Captain Notting
 William Ellis as Aubrey

Episode list

Reception
The series has received widespread acclaim from British critics, The Independents Grace Dent going so far as to proclaim it "one of the finest things the BBC has ever made". Others praised Cumberbatch and Hall in the lead roles, Cumberbatch for his ability to express suppressed pain, The Independents Gerard Gilbert observed, "Perhaps no other actor of his generation is quite so capable of suggesting the tumult beneath a crusty, seemingly inert surface". The Arts Desks Emma Dibdin found "Cumberbatch's performance... faultless and often achingly moving, a painful juxtaposition of emotional stiffness and deep, crippling vulnerability". Hall's Sylvia was lauded as "one of the great female characters of the past decade" by Caitlin Moran, who also wrote that "the script and direction have genius-level IQ" in her Times TV column.

Parade's End attracted 3.5 million viewers for its first episode, making it the most watched BBC2 drama since Rome (2005). The second episode had a drop in ratings with 2.2 million viewers. A few viewers found the sound mixing awkward, the dialogue difficult to hear and understand.

The miniseries received generally favourable reviews from American and Canadian television critics for its HBO broadcast, according to Metacritic. Writing for Roger Ebert's Chicago Sun-Times column, Jeff Shannon wrote that the miniseries has "up-scale directing" and "award-worthy performances" while Brad Oswald of the Winnipeg Free Press called it "a television masterpiece". Ford's tetralogy became a best-seller after the dramatisation was broadcast on the BBC.

Awards and nominations
Parade's End was nominated for numerous awards. Both Benedict Cumberbatch and Rebecca Hall won the Broadcasting Press Guild awards for Best Actor and Actress respectively, while Tom Stoppard picked up the Writer's Award and the series itself won Best Drama Series.

The miniseries received six BAFTA TV nominations, including Best Actress for Rebecca Hall and five Primetime Emmy Award nominations including Best Adapted Screenplay for Tom Stoppard and Best Actor for Benedict Cumberbatch. It won Best Costume Design at the BAFTAs.

Merchandise
BBC Books produced a tie-in edition of Parade's End with Cumberbatch, Hall, and Clemens on the cover. It was made available in the UK on 16 August 2012.

Faber & Faber published a
Parade End companion book by Tom Stoppard, which includes the script, production stills, and deleted scenes omitted from the broadcast.

The soundtrack by Dirk Brossé was released in digital and physical copies on 2 October 2012.

The BBC released DVD and Blu-ray copies of the series on 8 October 2012. They include behind the scenes footage and selected interviews with crew and cast members.

References

External links
 
 
 

2012 British television series debuts
2012 British television series endings
2010s British drama television series
2010s British television miniseries
HBO original programming
BBC television dramas
Ford Madox Ford
Television shows based on British novels
Television series set in the 1910s
Television shows set in France
Television shows set in London
Television shows set in Yorkshire
Television series by Mammoth Screen
Films with screenplays by Tom Stoppard
World War I television drama series
Films directed by Susanna White